Gregory Stephen Poirier (born 19 May 1961) is an American film and television writer, director, and producer.

Life and career
Poirier was born in Kula, Maui, Hawaii, and attended the Maui Academy of Performing Arts. He wrote the screenplay for the John Singleton-directed film Rosewood (1997), for which he won the Writers Guild of America's Paul Selvin Award.  He also wrote the screenplay for the comedy See Spot Run (2001) and wrote and directed the comedy Tomcats (2001).

Poirier's other writing credits include The Lion King II: Simba's Pride, A Sound of Thunder, Gossip, National Treasure: Book of Secrets, and The Spy Next Door, starring Jackie Chan.

Poirier is creator, executive producer, and writer of the ABC mystery series Missing, starring Ashley Judd, which aired for one season in 2012.

References

External links

 2002 Honolulu Star-Bulletin, 24 June 2002
 Honolulu Advertiser, 16 May 2004

1961 births
American film directors
American male screenwriters
Living people
People from Hawaii